Gideon Johann van der Merwe (born ) is a South African rugby union player for  in the Currie Cup and the Rugby Challenge. His regular position is flank.

References

1995 births
Living people
Cheetahs (rugby union) players
Griquas (rugby union) players
Leopards (rugby union) players
Rugby union flankers
Rugby union players from Potchefstroom
South African rugby union players
Free State Cheetahs players